Banjo Dan and the Mid-nite Plowboys was an American bluegrass band.  It was formed in 1972 and disbanded in 2012.

History
Banjo Dan and the Mid-nite Plowboys was formed in 1972 in Vermont. Dan and Willy Lindner, Al Davis, and Peter Tourin began playing bluegrass music in Vermont’s Green Mountains.  The band and band members have released over seventeen albums.

Banjo Dan and the Mid-nite Plowboys were Vermont Public Broadcasting System's Guest of the House in 1983.   The band played their final public concert at the Barre (Vermont) Opera House on September 29, 2012.  Founding members “Banjo Dan” Linder, mandolinist Will Lindner and guitarist Al Davis were joined by bass player Jon Henry Drake and fiddler Phil Bloch.

Dan and Willy Lindner currently perform primarily as 'The Sky Blue Boys' duo.

Discography
 Fire in the Sugarhouse - 2008
 Mystery and Memories: Banjo Dan's Songs of Vermont Volume 3 - 2006
 Like a River: A Bluegrass Journey - 2002
 Some Rust...Runs Good - 2000
 The Catamount is Back: Banjo Dan's Songs of Vermont Vol. II - 1994
 Banjo Dan and the Mid-Nite Plowboys - 1990
 I'll Take the Hills: Banjo Dan's Songs of Vermont - 1987
 Green Mountain Skyline - 1986
 Sleepin' Under the Bridge - 1983
 The Lindner Brothers: With Friends Like These - 1981
 High Time - 1977
 Snowfall - 1974 (includes minor hit "Rumford, South Dakota, is No More")

References

External links
 International Bluegrass Music Association.
 Society for the Preservation of Bluegrass Music of America
 

American folk musical groups
American bluegrass music groups